St. Patrick's High School was a high school in Monrovia, Liberia, from 1936 to 1996. It was one of the top secondary schools in the country.

History
In 1934, after being appointed Vicar Apostolic of Liberia, Father John Collins founded the St. Patrick School in Monrovia for the benefit of local children under the auspices of the Society of African Missions. He was rejoined by Father Francis Carroll in 1936, and under their direction, the school extended to the secondary level in 1939. 

In 1943, the school's first five graduates finished their scholarship, a first for a Catholic school in Liberia.

After Father John Collins died in 1961, Father Francis Carroll was consecrated Bishop of Monrovia, and one year later made the arrangements for the Brothers of Holy Cross to take over the management of St. Patrick's High School.

Maintaining a high profile for its excellent education, the school was closed for a time during the 1989 civil war. Two nuns, Sister Agnes and Sister Shirley, reopened the school. Both were killed in 1992 by National Patriotic Front of Liberia (NPFL) rebel leader Charles Taylor's forces during the continued strife.

The brothers then ran the school until April 6, 1996, when the hierarchy closed all Catholic facilities.

Notable alumni

 Emmanuel Nyan Gbalazeh – Chief Justice, Supreme Court of Liberia.

Principals

Father Francis Carroll (1936–)
Father Thomas Lakins
Father Joseph Guinan
Father Michael Rooney
Father O'Donovan
Brother Donald Allen
Brother Austin Maley
Brother Paul Clark 
Brother John Zoglemann 
Brother Edward Foken (1971–79, 1980–84)
Brother James Newberry (1982–89)
Sister Shirley Kolmer 
Richard Goodlin - 1996

See also

 Education in Liberia
 List of schools in Liberia
 Religion in Liberia

References

1936 establishments in Liberia
Christian schools in Liberia
Defunct high schools
Defunct private schools
1996 disestablishments in Liberia
Educational institutions disestablished in 1996
Educational institutions established in 1936
Holy Cross secondary schools
Catholic Church in Liberia
Catholic secondary schools in Africa 
Schools in Monrovia
Defunct schools in Liberia